Dani Anwar (22 February 1968 – 3 August 2020) was an Indonesian politician who served as a Senator. He died from COVID-19 during the COVID-19 pandemic in Indonesia.

References

1968 births
2020 deaths
Prosperous Justice Party politicians
Politicians from Jakarta
Deaths from the COVID-19 pandemic in Indonesia